The Consulate General of the United States in Surabaya is an American diplomatic mission in Surabaya, East Java and only consulate general and one of the four American diplomatic and consular posts in Indonesia. The Consulate General in Surabaya leads for the U.S. diplomatic mission in the 12 provinces of middle and eastern Indonesia (Central Java, East Java, Bali, NTB, NTT, South Sulawesi, Southeast Sulawesi, Central Sulawesi, Gorontalo, North Sulawesi,  North Maluku, and Maluku) over a third of Indonesia's population

History 
The United States of America has been represented in Surabaya since 1866, when Carlo von Oven arrived as the first United States Diplomatic Representative in Surabaya under the rule of Dutch colonial Empire in the East Indies. In August 1890, John Lidgerwood became the first American diplomat assigned to Surabaya.

At the time of the Independence of Indonesia in 1945, Surabaya was the largest city in the Dutch East Indies and Southeast Asia. East Java was also an economic hub of the Dutch East Indies because of the bustling spice trade and dominated Surabaya as the largest port in Nusantara. The consular agent would report back to the American Embassy in The Hague (government seat of the Dutch Empire) on American interests in Surabaya.

The United States Consular Agency was a highly active post, largely due to the industrial development taking place in and around Surabaya, much of it involving American companies such as General Motors. In 1918 it was elevated to full Consulate status, with offices located at Jalan Darmokali 38.

Many important visitors passed through the consulate, including Senators Millard Tydings and William McAdoo, as well as Margaret Mead, the famed American anthropologist. Over the years, the consulate has also had the opportunity to entertain other well-known persons. In 1931, Claudette Colbert visited Surabaya, and in 1933 Charlie Chaplin also arrived at Surabaya.

The Consulate moved on Jalan Raya Dr. Soetomo 33 in 1950. On August 1, 1990, the Consulate upgrade status to become a Consulate General in recognition of the economic importance of Surabaya and East Java.  On April 9, 2012, Consulate General moved to new office on Jalan Citra Raya Niaga No. 2, western side of Surabaya.

Mark McGovern is current consul general since July 2018.

Jonathan Alan has replaced Mark McGovern in August 2021

See also 

 Indonesia–United States relations
 List of diplomatic missions of the United States
 U.S. Embassy, Jakarta
 Indonesian Americans

References

External links 

 Consulate General of the United States, Surabaya

Diplomatic missions of the United States
Indonesia–United States relations
United States